Marcos Llorente Moreno (born 30 January 1995) is a Spanish professional footballer who plays as a midfielder or a right-back for La Liga club Atlético Madrid and the Spain national team. 

Developed at Real Madrid, he appeared in 39 competitive matches over three seasons, also serving a loan at Alavés. He signed with Atlético Madrid in June 2019, winning La Liga in his second season while being deployed in several positions.

Llorente made his full debut for Spain in 2020. He was part of the squads at UEFA Euro 2020 and the 2022 FIFA World Cup.

Club career

Real Madrid

Born in Madrid, Llorente joined Real Madrid's youth setup in 2008, aged 13. In July 2014, after impressing with the Juvenil squad, he was promoted straight to the reserves by manager Zinedine Zidane.

On 24 August 2014, Llorente made his senior debut, starting in a 2–1 away loss against Atlético Madrid B in the Segunda División B. He appeared in 25 matches during the campaign, totalling 1,637 minutes of action.

Llorente spent the 2015 pre-season with the first team, appearing in friendlies against Manchester City, Inter Milan and Vålerenga Fotball. He made his professional – and La Liga – debut on 17 October of that year, coming on as a second-half substitute for Mateo Kovačić in the 3–0 home win over Levante UD.

On 10 August 2016, Llorente was loaned to Deportivo Alavés for the season. On 10 September, he featured the full 90 minutes in a 2–1 victory at FC Barcelona.

On 23 September 2017, Llorente's contract was extended until 2021. He made one appearance in that campaign's UEFA Champions League, when Madrid won their third consecutive and 13th overall title in the tournament.

Llorente scored his first competitive goal for the team on 22 December 2018, netting the second in the 4–1 defeat of Al Ain FC in the final of the FIFA Club World Cup and being named player of the match in the process.

Atlético Madrid
On 20 June 2019, Llorente was signed by local rivals Atlético Madrid on a five-year contract for a reported fee of £35 million. He made his official debut on 18 August, playing 25 minutes in the 1–0 home win against Getafe CF. His first goal came the following 14 February, when he put his team ahead in a 2–2 draw at Valencia CF.

On 11 March 2020, during extra time of the Champions League round-of-16 tie away to defending champions Liverpool, Llorente scored twice to tie the match 2–2 after replacing Diego Costa early into the second half, in an eventual 3–2 victory and qualification. On 17 June, he was named man of the match in the league game at CA Osasuna after coming from the bench in the 63rd minute, scoring a solo goal and later assisting twice in the 5–0 rout.

Llorente scored a career-best 12 times in 2020–21 (second-best in the squad behind Luis Suárez's 21), adding 11 assists as the Colchoneros were crowned champions after a seven-year wait; in the process, he became the club's first player to register double digits in both categories since Diego Forlán in 2008–09.

International career
Llorente earned his first cap for the Spain under-21 side on 10 October 2016, featuring the entire 5–0 home defeat of Estonia in the 2017 UEFA European Under-21 Championship qualifiers, in Pontevedra. He was called up to the senior squad in November 2020, for a friendly with the Netherlands and UEFA Nations League qualifiers against Switzerland and Germany. He made his first appearance against the first opponent, replacing Sergio Canales for the last 18 minutes of the 1–1 draw in Amsterdam.

On 24 May 2021, Llorente was included in Spain's 24-man squad for UEFA Euro 2020. He was deployed as right-back during the tournament.

Llorente was also picked for the 2022 FIFA World Cup. He only took part in one match in Qatar, the 3–0 penalty shootout loss against Morocco in the last 16.

Style of play
Originally a defensive midfielder or a playmaker in front of a back four, Llorente is also capable of playing in more advanced positions such as a central or box-to-box midfielder. At Atlético Madrid, under coach Diego Simeone, he was also fielded out of his regular position, first on the right side of the midfield in a 4–4–2 formation and later as a supporting forward in the same system.

At the conclusion of 2019–20, Llorente was the sixth fastest player in the competition, with his top running speed clocked at 35.09 km/h. Apart from his physical attributes, such as pace, height, body fitness and stamina, his strengths also included excellent ball winning skills, visionary passing over both short and long distances, dribbling, first touch and shooting from just outside the penalty area, which led him to score several goals. The following season, as Atlético went through a tactical switch, he was usually deployed as either a box-to-box or an attacking midfielder in a 5–3–2 or 3–4–2–1 formations. On occasion, he also filled in as a right wingback for his club, or a right back in a four-man defence for the national team.

For his training attitude and patience, Llorente was praised by Simeone and Jorge Valdano.

Personal life
A boyhood supporter of Real Madrid, Llorente has ties in his family to both football and the club. His father Francisco and great uncle Francisco Gento were wingers, while his maternal grandfather Ramón Grosso was a forward.

Career statistics

Club

International

Honours
Real Madrid
UEFA Champions League: 2017–18
FIFA Club World Cup: 2017, 2018

Atlético Madrid
La Liga: 2020–21

Spain U21
UEFA European Under-21 Championship runner-up: 2017

References

External links

Atlético Madrid official profile

Living people
1995 births
Spanish footballers
Footballers from Madrid
Association football midfielders
Association football forwards
Association football utility players
La Liga players
Segunda División B players
Real Madrid Castilla footballers
Real Madrid CF players
Deportivo Alavés players
Atlético Madrid footballers
Spain youth international footballers
Spain under-21 international footballers
Spain international footballers
UEFA Euro 2020 players
2022 FIFA World Cup players
Gento family